Alice Marian Hambidge (2 October 1869 – 20 January 1947) was an Australian artist.

Born in Kensington, South Australia on 2 October 1869, Hambidge received art training at the School of Design in Adelaide in 1893.

Her work is included in the collections of the Art Gallery of South Australia, the Art Gallery of New South Wales and the National Library of Australia.

Hambidge Crescent in the Canberra suburb of Chisholm is named in honour of her and her sisters Helen and Millicent.

References

1869 births
1947 deaths
20th-century Australian women artists
20th-century Australian artists